The Rocks of Valpre may refer to:

 The Rocks of Valpré (novel), a 1914 novel by Ethel M. Dell
 The Rocks of Valpre (1919 film)
 The Rocks of Valpre (1935 film)